MRM1 may refer to:

 the MRM1 (gene)
 the Rassvet (ISS module)